His Majesty's Prisons (Her Majesty's Prisons in the case of a female monarch) is the name given to prisons in the United Kingdom, as well as some in Australia and a small number in Canada, Grenada, Jersey, The Bahamas and Barbados. The title makes up part of the name of individual prisons and is usually abbreviated to HM Prison or HMP.

Australia

The title of HM Prison is given to a number of prisons in Australia, especially in the state of Victoria.

Bahamas

Fox Hill Prison in Nassau was formerly known as Her Majesty's Prisons.

Barbados
The title of HM Prison was given to HMP Dodds Prison in St. Philip, until the crown was dissolved, it was also the name given to the former Glendairy Prison in Station Hill, St. Michael.

Belize
The Belize Museum was formerly a HM prison.

Canada
His Majesty's Penitentiary at 89 Forest Road in St. John's, Newfoundland was built in 1859, and is still operational as a men’s correctional facility of the Department of Justice and Public Safety of Newfoundland and Labrador. The provincial government is currently planning to build a new facility to replace His Majesty′s Prison.

The province of Newfoundland Labrador operates five correctional facilities and two short-term holding cells, under the banner (HMP) His Majesty's Penitentiary.

 HMP, St. John's. (Located in the City of St. John's, NL)
 Clarenville Correctional Centre for Women. (Located in the town of Carenville, NL)
 Bishop's Falls Correctional Centre (Located in the town of Bishop's Falls, NL)
 West Coast Correctional Centre. (Located in the town of Stephenville, NL)
 Labrador Correctional Centre. (Located in the town of Goose Bay, NL)
 St. John's Lock-up. (Located in the City of St. Johns, NL)
 Corner Brook Lock-up. (Located in the City of Corner Brook, NL)

In November 2021, the government of NL, issued a request for proposals to design, build and finance a new prison to replace the aging HMP facility.

Gibraltar

HM Prison Moorish Castle (defunct)
HM Prison Windmill Hill

Grenada

The title of His Majesty's Prison (Grenada) is given to the Richmond Hill Prison in Saint George's, Grenada. The prison is run by the Ministry of National Security. The prison governor is Dr John Mitchell, the Commissioner of Prisons in Grenada.

The prison accommodates both sexes, but has separate sections for male and female prisoners.  it held 463 prisoners, more than double its official capacity of 198.

United Kingdom

See also
 Hong Kong Correctional Services - British Colonial prison system from 1879 to 1997
 ‘At His Majesty's pleasure’: a prison sentence of indefinite length

References

Penal system in the United Kingdom
Prisons in Australia